Sobasina amoenula is a species of jumping spider.

Distribution
Sobasina amoenula is endemic to the Solomon Islands.

References
  (1998): Salticidae of the Pacific Islands. III.  Distribution of Seven Genera, with Description of Nineteen New Species and Two New Genera. Journal of Arachnology  26(2): 149-189. PDF

Salticidae
Fauna of the Solomon Islands
Spiders of Oceania
Spiders described in 1898